John Blair Brown (26 May 1856 – 17 May 1904) was a Scotland international rugby union player. He played as a forward.

Rugby Union career

Amateur career

He played for Glasgow Academicals, one of the top teams in Scotland at the time.

Provincial career

He was called up for the Glasgow District side for the 1874 provincial match against Edinburgh District on 5 December 1874.

He played for West of Scotland District in their match against East of Scotland District on 1 March 1879.

International career

He was called up to the Scotland squad on 17 February 1879 and played Ireland at Belfast on 17 February 1879.

References

1856 births
1904 deaths
Rugby union players from Glasgow
Scottish rugby union players
Scotland international rugby union players
History of rugby union in Scotland
Glasgow Academicals rugby union players
Glasgow District (rugby union) players
West of Scotland District (rugby union) players
Rugby union forwards